Angelo Frigerio was an Italian bobsledder who competed during the 1960s. He won the silver medal in the four-man event at the 1963 FIBT World Championships in Igls.

Frigerio later became a bobsleigh coach.

References
Bobsleigh four-man world championship medalists since 1930
Olympic solidarity bobsleigh training featuring Frigerio as a coach. Olympic Review. February 1981

Italian male bobsledders
Living people
Year of birth missing (living people)